Eschata shafferella is a moth in the family Crambidae. It was described by Stanisław Błeszyński in 1965. It is found in Sichuan province in China and Darjeeling in India.

References

Chiloini
Moths described in 1965